Tecticornia arborea, the bulli bulli, is a species of flowering plant in the family Amaranthaceae, native to Western Australia. Its seeds are edible and consumed by local peoples.

References

arborea
Endemic flora of Western Australia
Plants described in 1972